Quirigua is a station that is part of the TransMilenio mass-transit system of Bogotá, Colombia, which opened in the year 2000.

Location

The station is located in northwestern Bogotá, specifically on Calle 80 with Carrera 94.

It receives its name from the neighborhood of the same name located to the north of the station. It also serves the neighborhoods of París Gaitán and Santa Rosita.

History

In 2000, phase one of the TransMilenio system was opened between Portal de la 80 and Tercer Milenio, including this station.

Station Services

Old trunk services

Main Line Service

Feeder routes

This station does not have connections to feeder routes.

Inter-city service

This station does not have inter-city service.

External links
TransMilenio

See also
Bogotá
TransMilenio
List of TransMilenio Stations

TransMilenio